The Bangladesh Jatiya League  ('Bangladesh National League ', abbreviated BJL) was a dissolved political party in Bangladesh.
Ataur Rahman Khan was the leader of the party.

Notable members
Ataur Rahman Khan
Oli Ahad

References

Defunct political parties in Bangladesh
Political parties established in 1968
Political parties disestablished in 1984